Jack Carlin  (born 23 April 1997) is a Scottish track cyclist, who competes in sprinting events and won two medals at the 2020 Tokyo Olympics.

Cycling career
In 2016, Carlin won his first senior international medal when taking silver at the European Track Championships in the team sprint.

In 2018 he won silver medals at the World Championships in both the sprint and team sprint. This was followed by silver in the sprint at the Commonwealth Games and  bronze at the European Championships in the keirin.

Carlin again achieved a silver medal in the team sprint at the 2020 World Championships. He then went on to become a double olympic medallist in Tokyo, winning silver and bronze in the team sprint and sprint respectively.

At the 2022 British National Track Championships in Newport, Wales he won three more British titles (having previously won five) after winning the sprint, keirin and the team sprint. Later that year, he won silver in the keirin and bronze in the sprint at the 2022 Commonwealth Games. The latter was awarded following the relegation of Matthew Glaetzer in the deciding race after he was adjudged to have deviated from his racing line and unduly interfered with Carlin's sprint.

Major results

2016
Track Cycling World Cup
1st  Team sprint, Round 1 (Glasgow)
1st  Team sprint, Round 2 (Apeldoorn)
European Track Championships
2nd  Team sprint, 
2018
UCI Track Cycling World Championships
2nd  Team sprint
2nd  Sprint
Commonwealth Games
2nd  Sprint
European Track Championships
3rd  Keirin
2019
European Track Championships
2nd  Team sprint
2020
UCI Track Cycling World Championships
2nd  Team sprint
2021
Olympic Games
2nd  Team sprint
3rd  Sprint
2022
Commonwealth Games
2nd  Keirin
3rd  Sprint

References

External links

1997 births
Living people
British male cyclists
British track cyclists
Scottish track cyclists
Sportspeople from Paisley, Renfrewshire
Commonwealth Games medallists in cycling
Commonwealth Games silver medallists for Scotland
Commonwealth Games bronze medallists for Scotland
Cyclists at the 2018 Commonwealth Games
Cyclists at the 2019 European Games
European Games medalists in cycling
European Games bronze medalists for Great Britain
Olympic cyclists of Great Britain
Cyclists at the 2020 Summer Olympics
Medalists at the 2020 Summer Olympics
Olympic medalists in cycling
Olympic silver medallists for Great Britain
Olympic bronze medallists for Great Britain
Scottish Olympic medallists
Cyclists at the 2022 Commonwealth Games
Medallists at the 2018 Commonwealth Games
Medallists at the 2022 Commonwealth Games